Jamison Newlander (born April 2, 1970) is an American actor. He starred in the 1987 horror film The Lost Boys, playing vampire hunter Alan Frog.

Career 
Newlander is best known for his role as Alan Frog, one of the two vampire-hunting Frog brothers, in The Lost Boys (1987), alongside Corey Feldman. He reprises his role as Alan Frog in the Lost Boys: The Thirst (2010), as he and Feldman fight side-by-side again for what's been celebrated as the return of the Frog Brothers. Newlander also makes an appearance as Alan Frog in one of the alternative endings for Lost Boys: The Tribe (2008). He also played alongside River Phoenix in a TV Movie, Circle of Violence: A Family Drama, and Jason Bateman in Valerie. He also appeared in the 1988 remake of The Blob. He starred in two commercials during the 80s, for Pearle Vision and AT&T in 1984 and 1987 respectively.

A graduate of Beverly Hills High School, he went on to get a BFA in acting at NYU, and acted on stages in New York, Vermont, Kentucky and California throughout his 20s. While doing theater, Newlander began writing and became an award-winning playwright with his 1996 play Remember This at Actors Theatre of Louisville. He put all of his talents together (writing, directing and acting) for his film "Rooster," which played on the film festival circuit, most notably at the Hamptons International Film Festival in 2003. In 2009, he then went on to write, produce, direct and star in a second short film titled Room Service. He made cameo appearances in both seasons of The Two Coreys, a reality TV show starring Lost Boys co-stars Corey Haim and Corey Feldman on A&E Network. Since then, he has played small roles in multiple movies, including Bone Tomahawk, alongside Kurt Russell. Newlander created Wikisoap, the first ever user-created soap opera on the web. He is currently working on his play, The Virtual Adventures of Riff-Cat Polito He had a cameo appearance as a police officer in The Tale of Two Coreys, the Lifetime movie documenting the lives of Corey Haim and Corey Feldman. In 2010, he reprised his role as Alan Frog in Lost Boys: The Thirst.

Newlander co-hosted a short bi-weekly podcast called "The Jamison Newlander and Some Other Guy Show" with an unidentified co-host. The podcast included regular updates on Newlander's life and career, as well as comedy sketches, celebrity guests, and casual conversation. It was released every second Sunday, but is now on extended hiatus, although previous episodes remain available. Newlander is working on an upcoming second podcast titled Current Frequencies, a collection of original 20-30 minute radio-dramas based on contemporary issues.

Personal life 
Newlander was born on April 2, 1970 in New York City. He is the youngest of a Jewish family with Italian descent, with two older sisters. At the age of two his parents divorced. As a child, he was a somewhat slow reader, which later in life was attributed to mild dyslexia. He wore leg braces from ages seven to nine due to necrosis. With the leg braces, he played baseball, and had a runner who ran for him after he hit the ball. Inspired by the doctors he was surrounded with at a young age, he decided that he wanted to be an orthopaedic surgeon. His mother suggested he did commercials to get money for medical school. Ironically, this instead led him to a career in acting.

In 2002, he married fellow actress Hanny Landau. They have two sons, Nathan Dov Newlander (born 15 August 2008) and Azi Sylvester Newlander (born 12 November 2012).

Filmography

References

External links 
 
 The Jamison Newlander and Some Other Guy Show on iTunes
 The Jamison Newlander and Some Other Guy Show on SoundCloud

1968 births
Male actors from New York City
American male film actors
New York University alumni
Living people
21st-century American male actors
20th-century American male actors